Uinsky District is an administrative district (raion) of Perm Krai, Russia; one of the thirty-three in the krai. Municipally, it is incorporated as Uinsky Municipal District. It is located in the south of the krai. Its administrative center is the rural locality (a selo) of Uinskoye. Population:  The population of Uinskoye accounts for 37.6% of the district's total population.

Geography
Main rivers of the district are the Iren and its tributaries the Syp, the Aspa, and the Teles.

History
The district was established on September 15, 1926. It was abolished between June 10, 1931 and January 25, 1935 and then again between February 1, 1963 and December 30, 1966.

Demographics
Ethnic composition:
Russians: 63.9%
Tatars: 33.4%

Economy
The economy of the district is based on agriculture, forestry, timber, and food industry.

References

Notes

Sources

Districts of Perm Krai
States and territories established in 1926
States and territories disestablished in 1932
States and territories established in 1935
States and territories disestablished in 1963
States and territories established in 1966